Butterfly is a documentary film directed by Doug Wolens about the environmental heroine and tree sitter Julia Butterfly Hill who gained the attention of the world for her two-year vigil 180 feet atop Luna, an ancient redwood tree preventing it from being clear-cut. The film first aired on PBS in 2000.

Cast
Julia Hill acts as herself

See also
The Legacy of Luna, Hill's 2000 memoir

References

External links
 
 
 P.O.V. Butterfly - PBS's site dedicated to the film

2000 television films
2000 films
2000 in the environment
2000s English-language films
American documentary television films
POV (TV series) films
Documentary films about forests and trees
2000 documentary films
Films about activists
Julia Butterfly Hill
Squatting in film
Squatting in the United States
2000s American films